Francis John Ashe (born London, 11 February 1953) was Archdeacon of Lynn from 2009 until 2018.

Ashe was educated at Christ's Hospital; the University of Sheffield and Ridley Hall, Cambridge. After an earlier career as a metallurgist he was ordained deacon in 1979, and priest in 1980. After a curacy in Ashtead he was Priest in charge at St Faith, Plumstead, Cape Town. He was Rector of Wisley with Pyrford from 1987 to 1993; and of Godalming from 1993 to 2009 (also Rural Dean 1996 to 2002).

References

1953 births
English metallurgists
People educated at Christ's Hospital
Alumni of the University of Sheffield
Alumni of Ridley Hall, Cambridge
20th-century English Anglican priests
21st-century English Anglican priests
Archdeacons of Lynn
Living people